Cieśle Małe (German 1939-1945 Ostfelde)  is a village in the administrative district of Gmina Kołaczkowo, within Września County, Greater Poland Voivodeship, in west-central Poland.

References

Villages in Września County